Euphorbia primulifolia is a species of plant in the family Euphorbiaceae. It is endemic to Madagascar.  Its natural habitats are subtropical or tropical seasonally wet or flooded lowland grassland, subtropical or tropical high-altitude grassland, and rocky areas.this plant smells. It is threatened by habitat loss.

References

Endemic flora of Madagascar
primulifolia
Vulnerable plants
Taxonomy articles created by Polbot
Taxa named by John Gilbert Baker